Zelenyi Hai is a village in Henichesk Raion, Kherson Oblast, southern Ukraine. It belongs to the Henichesk urban hromada, one of the hromadas of Ukraine. It  is situated east of village .

References

Villages in Henichesk Raion